The 1856 United States presidential election in Michigan took place on November 4, 1856, as part of the 1856 United States presidential election. Voters chose six representatives, or electors to the Electoral College, who voted for president and vice president.

Michigan voted for the Republican candidate, John C. Frémont, over Democratic candidate, James Buchanan. Frémont won Michigan by a margin of 15.63%.

With 57.15% of the popular vote, Michigan proved to be Fremont's fifth strongest in the 1856 election after Vermont, Massachusetts, Maine and Rhode Island. 

This marked the first of eighteen Republican victories in Michigan over the next nineteen presidential election cycles. Michigan would not vote for a Democratic candidate again until Franklin D. Roosevelt in 1932, and would not vote for a different candidate until Theodore Roosevelt’s third-party bid in 1912. Michigan would also not send any Democratic electors to the Electoral College until Grover Cleveland won 5 of the state’s 14 electoral votes in 1892.

Results

See also
 United States presidential elections in Michigan

References

Michigan
1856
1856 Michigan elections